Shalom College is an independent Catholic secondary school, located in Bundaberg, Queensland, Australia. The college was established in 1984 by merging the Christian Brothers' College for Boys and the Loyola College for Girls. The school's current principal is Dan McMahon. In 2018, there were 1,380 students enrolled at the school, as well as approximately 200 staff members.

Campus
The main campus is set amongst  of bushland off of Fitzgerald Street, Bundaberg. Shalom College welcomes students of other faiths. The school requires parents to agree to actively support its religious education program and Christian ethos. Students can use its facilities for camps and are offered activities such as canoeing, rock-climbing or archery. The land on which the school is built was donated by Walter Adams. Adams is buried in the Catholic cemetery, adjacent to the school grounds on Fitzgerald Street. The college house "Adams" was named for him.

Pastoral houses
The eight pastoral houses are as follows, with two additional houses being introduced in 2022:

Each house has two house leaders: traditionally one male and one female.

Sports
A range of sports and extra-curricular activities are offered. These activities include soccer, basketball, softball, netball, rugby league, rugby union, rowing, surfing and tenpin bowling. SCASA, (Shalom College After School Activities) run 4 afternoons a week with students receiving afternoon tea.

Notable alumni

 Simon DoyleAustralian 1500m men's champion 1990

 Felise Kaufusirugby league footballer for Melbourne Storm and Queensland

See also

 List of schools in Queensland
 Catholic education in Australia

References

External links
 Shalom College Bundaberg

1984 establishments in Australia
Catholic secondary schools in Queensland
Schools in Bundaberg
Educational institutions established in 1984
Roman Catholic Diocese of Rockhampton
Former Congregation of Christian Brothers schools in Australia